Franziskus von Bettinger (17 September 1850 – 12 April 1917) was a German Cardinal and Roman Catholic Archbishop of Munich from 1909 to 1917.

Biography
Bettinger was born in Landstuhl in the Palatinate, the eldest of the six children (five sons and one daughter) of Franz Michael Bettinger, a blacksmith, and his wife, Maria Josephine Weber.

He studied philosophy, theology and canon law at the Lyceum of Speyer, the University of Innsbruck, the University of Würzburg, and the Seminary of Speyer.  He was ordained to the priesthood on 17 August 1873 in Speyer.

Bettinger held a number of pastoral posts in the diocese of Speyer: chaplain in Zweibrücken, 1873-1877; chaplain in Kaiserslautern, 1877-1878; cooperator in Reichenbach, 1878-1879; administrator, and later pastor and school inspector in Lambaheim, 1879-1888; pastor in Roxheim, 1888-1895.

In 1895 he was named a canon of the cathedral chapter and pastor of Speyer. In 1909 he was promoted to the office of dean of the cathedral chapter. Shortly afterwards he was ennobled by Prince Regent Luitpold of Bavaria; henceforth he had the surname von Bettinger.

On 6 June 1909 Bettinger was elected archbishop of Munich and Freising. He was ordained a bishop on 15 August 1909 in Münich by Andreas Früwirth, Titular Archbishop of Eraclea, Nuncio to Bavaria.

In the consistory of 24 May 1914 Pope Pius X named Bettinger a cardinal. On 28 May he received the red hat and the title of Cardinal Priest of San Marcello. He participated in the 1914 conclave.

Bettinger died suddenly of a heart attack in Munich, aged 66. His remains are buried in the crypt of the cathedral.

References

External links

Catholic Hierarchy 

1850 births
1917 deaths
20th-century German cardinals
Canons (priests)
People from the Palatinate (region)
Roman Catholic archbishops of Munich and Freising
Members of the Bavarian Reichsrat
Burials at Munich Frauenkirche
Cardinals created by Pope Pius X
German Roman Catholic archbishops